Felix Bartsch was a German composer. He wrote accompanying music for more than fifty films during the silent era.

Selected filmography
 Claire (1924)
 Taras Bulba (1924)
 Upstairs and Downstairs (1925)
 The Circus Princess (1925)
 Orphan of Lowood (1926)
 I Liked Kissing Women (1926)
 The Young Man from the Ragtrade (1926)
 The Schimeck Family (1926)
 The Love of the Bajadere (1926)
 Women of Passion (1926)
 The Woman in Gold (1926)
 The Sea Cadet (1926)
 Annemarie and Her Cavalryman (1926)
 Kissing Is No Sin (1926)
 German Hearts on the German Rhine (1926)
 Vienna, How it Cries and Laughs (1926)
 The Captain from Koepenick (1926)
 The Laughing Husband (1926)
 Wrath of the Seas (1926)
 The Divorcée (1926)
 Rhenish Girls and Rhenish Wine (1927)
 A Girl of the People (1927)
 Circle of Lovers (1927)
 Circus Renz (1927)
 The Woman from the Folies Bergères (1927)
 The Curse of Vererbung (1927)
 Flirtation (1927)
 The Lorelei (1927)
 Light-Hearted Isabel (1927)
 Bismarck 1862–1898 (1927)
 On the Banks of the River Weser (1927)
 The Villa in Tiergarten Park (1927)
 Weekend Magic (1927)
 Rinaldo Rinaldini (1927)
 The Criminal of the Century (1928)
 Fair Game (1928)
 Darling of the Dragoons (1928)

References

Bibliography

External links

Year of birth unknown
Year of death unknown
20th-century German composers